"To Live Is to Fly" is a song written by Townes Van Zandt.   The name is also that of a biography about the songwriter, by the name To Live's to Fly: The Ballad of the Late, Great Townes Van Zandt.  It was covered by Wade Bowen on his album The Given.  It was also covered by Cowboy Junkies on their album Black Eyed Man.

References 

Townes Van Zandt songs
Year of song missing
Songs written by Townes Van Zandt